Cystoderma amianthinum, commonly called the saffron parasol, the saffron powder-cap, or the earthy powder-cap, is a small orange-ochre, or yellowish-brown, gilled mushroom. It grows in damp mossy grassland, in coniferous forest clearings, or on wooded heaths. It is probably the most common of the small genus Cystoderma. It is not recommended for consumption due to its resemblance to poisonous species.

Taxonomy
Cystoderma amianthinum was first noted by the Italian-Austrian naturalist Giovanni Antonio Scopoli, who called it Agaricus amianthinus in 1772. The present generic name Cystoderma was erected by Swiss mycologist Victor Fayod in 1889, and is roughly translated as 'blistered skin', and is probably a reference to the appearance of the pellicle (cap skin).

Description
It is dry and powdery, often with a shaggy or fringed margin (appendiculate), and is saffron-yellow or orange-ochre. The stem is cylindrical, and has a flaky-granular sheath beneath a fleeting, powdery ring. The gills are white initially, and become creamy later. They are adnexed (narrowly attached to the stem), and initially quite crowded. The spore print is white. The flesh is thin and yellowish, with an odor that is unpleasant or resembles husked corn.

A very similar form with a markedly radially wrinkled cap, has been separated by some authors, and given the binomial Cystoderma rugoso-reticulatum. Some forms have a whitish yellow cap. 

Cystodermella granulosa, and Cystodermella cinnabarina are both redder as a rule, and have adnate gills (broadly attached to the stem).

Distribution and habitat
Cystoderma amianthinum is widespread in Europe and North America, and common in northern temperate zones. It occurs in mossy woodland, on heaths, amongst grass or bracken, and sometimes with willow. It is often found on acidic soils.

Edibility
Cystoderma amianthinum is nonpoisonous, but eating is not advised as the deadly toxic Lepiota castanea is a common lookalike. It is also similar to the inedible Cystoderma fallax.

References

Agaricaceae
Fungi described in 1772
Fungi of Europe
Fungi of North America